Palmerella is a genus of prehistoric sea snails, marine gastropod mollusks in the family Turritellidae.

Species

Species within the genus Palmerella include:

 † Palmerella kutchensis Halder & Sinha, 2014 - from lower Middle Eocene of India
 † Palmerella mortoni (Conrad, 1830) - synonym: Turritella mortoni Conrad, 1830 - type species of the genus Palmerella
 † Palmerella ranikoti (Vredenburg, 1928)

References

External links

Turritellidae
Prehistoric gastropods